On Nut station is a BTS skytrain station, on the Sukhumvit line in the area of three district of Bangkok: Khlong Toei, Watthana, Phra Khanong.  The station is located on Sukhumvit Road to the south of On Nut junction (On Nut Road).

Inside the station gate you can find ATMs, a chemist and assorted other small businesses.

On Nut BTS station is connected via walkway to both a Tesco Lotus and Century Cinema complex.

On Nut BTS station is a terminus of Sukhumvit Line first section which opened 5 December 1999. Between 1999 and 2011 it was the eastern terminus of the line, until the opening of 5.2-km extension to Bearing Station.

See also
 Bangkok Skytrain

BTS Skytrain stations